Panipi Raya Football Club (simply known as Panipi Raya) is an Indonesian football club based in Gorontalo Regency, Gorontalo. They currently compete in the Liga 3 and their homeground is Porbat Batudaa Field.

Players

Current squad

Honours
 Liga 3 Gorontalo
 Runner-up: 2021

References

External links

 Gorontalo Regency
Football clubs in Indonesia
Football clubs in Gorontalo
Association football clubs established in 2016
2016 establishments in Indonesia